; born February 23, 2003) is a Japanese racehorse who won the 2007 Dubai Duty Free Stakes, Takarazuka Kinen and Japan Cup.

Background

Admire Moon was foaled on February 23, 2003, at Northern Farm in Abira, Hokkaido, Japan. He was bred by Katsumi Yoshida. He was sired by champion sire End Sweep and his dam was My Katies, a daughter of Sunday Silence. During the 2003 Japan Horse Racing Association Select Sale, Admire Moon was sold to Riichi Kondo for ¥16 million (roughly $135,000).  He was trained by Ritto Training Center trainer Hiroyoshi Matsuda.

Racing career

2005: two-year-old season
In 2005, Admire Moon started four times. He won the Clover Cho and the Sapporo Nisai Stakes, and came second in the Radio Tampa Hai Nisai Stakes.

2006: three-year-old season
At the beginning of his three-year-old season, Admire Moon won the Tokinominoru Kinen. He then won the Yayoi Sho, a trial race for the Satsuki Sho. Admire Moon ran in the Satsuki Sho (Japanese 2000 Guineas) later in 2006, his first Grade I race. He placed 4th to Meisho Samson.  He then went to Tokyo for the Japanese Derby, the Tokyo Yushun, where he placed 7th, also to Meisho Samson. That August, Admire Moon ran in the Sapporo Kinen, winning it. 

He returned to Tokyo in late October for the Tenno Sho, not the Kikuka Sho (the Japanese St. Leger), and finished 3rd to Daiwa Major. In December, he traveled to Hong Kong for the Hong Kong Cup, his first-ever race outside Japan. He finished second to Pride by a nose.

2007: four-year-old season
In 2007, he raced in Kyoto Kinen and won. He then headed to Dubai for the Dubai Duty Free Stakes. He finished first by half a length, winning his first ever Group One race, over Linngari, Daiwa Major, etc. On June 24, ridden by jockey Yasunari Iwata, he took on the Takarazuka Kinen by a vote of fans and finished first by half a length ahead of Vodka (the 2007 Tokyo Yushun winner), Daiwa Major etc., winning his first Grade I race in Japan. 

In the middle of his four-year-old season, Admire Moon was sold by his owner Riichi Kondo to Godolphin for ¥4 billion ($33 million). The sale was confirmed on July 24 of that year. 

Admire then ran in the Japan Cup the same year in November and won by a head over Pop Rock. With the Takarazuka Kinen win earlier in the year, Admire Moon earned a ¥130 million bonus in addition to over ¥250 million in prize money. Admire Moon retired after winning the Japan Cup. Overall, he raced 17 times, came first ten times, came second twice, and came third twice. After his retirement, he was named the Japanese Horse of the Year for 2007, as well as top older male.

Stud record
At the end of his racing career, Admire Moon was retired to become a breeding stallion at Darley Stud. The best of his offspring have included the sprinters Fine Needle and Seiun Kosei, both of whom won the Takamatsunomiya Kinen.

Pedigree

References

2003 racehorse births
Racehorses bred in Japan
Racehorses trained in Japan
Japan Cup winners
Japanese Thoroughbred Horse of the Year
Thoroughbred family 7-f